Selene Luna (born September 19, 1971, Tijuana, Baja California, Mexico) is a Mexican-American actress, comedian, burlesque performer, and model known for her roles on comedian Margaret Cho's reality TV series The Cho Show and in such films as My Bloody Valentine 3D.

She also performed with the burlesque troupe Velvet Hammer Burlesque and is the creator of her own one woman show entitled I Don't Care Anymore. She appeared on the cover for the Dwarves 2001 album How to Win Friends and Influence People.

Filmography
 Huluween Dragstravaganza (2022)
 Coco (2017)
Gingerdead Man 3: Saturday Night Cleaver (2011)
Demonic Toys 2 (2010)
Star-ving (2009)
My Bloody Valentine 3D (2009)
Celebrity Family Feud (2008)
The Cho Show (2008)
Firecracker (2005)

References

External links 

LA Weekly interview
Alarm Press interview

1971 births
Living people
Actors with dwarfism
American television actresses
American film actresses
American female models
American neo-burlesque performers
Mexican emigrants to the United States
Hispanic and Latino American actresses
American women comedians
21st-century American comedians
21st-century American actresses